The Younger Brothers is a 1949 American Western film directed by Edwin L. Marin and starring Wayne Morris, Bruce Bennett, Janis Paige.

Plot
Determined to reform from their outlaw ways, Cole, Jim and Bob Younger ride to Cedar Creek, Minnesota, where a parole hearing will be held. If they steer clear of trouble, the Youngers will be free to return home to Missouri and their farm.

A detective who blames the Youngers for losing his Pinkerton's job, Ryckman, is eager to get even. He goads a younger Younger brother, John, into a situation at a saloon where a man is killed. Ryckman urges townspeople to turn Sheriff Knudson against all the Youngers.

Katie Shepherd, who has a lawless band of her own, fails to persuade the Youngers to side with her, so she sets a trap. Cole, taken hostage, is forced to join Katie's gang on a bank robbery or else John will be harmed. Jim and Bob see their brother armed and riding with the outlaws, not knowing Cole's been given an unloaded gun.

The robbery goes wrong and Katie is killed. Ryckman continues to come after the Youngers, surrounding their campsite with the intent to lynch them. In the end, though, the Youngers are cleared of wrongdoing and able to ride away free and clear.

Cast
 Wayne Morris as Cole Younger
 Janis Paige as Katie Shepherd  
 Bruce Bennett as Jim Younger 
 Geraldine Brooks as Mary Hathaway
 Robert Hutton as Johnny Younger
 Alan Hale as Knudson
 Fred Clark as Ryckman
 Jimmy Noel as River Rock Townsman (his first acting role)

References

External links
 
 
 
 

1949 films
Films directed by Edwin L. Marin
James–Younger Gang
1949 Western (genre) films
American Western (genre) films
Films set in Minnesota
Films with screenplays by Edna Anhalt
1940s English-language films
1940s American films